Yffiniac (Gallo: Finyac) is a commune in the Côtes-d'Armor department of Brittany in northwestern France.

Population
Inhabitants of Yffiniac are called yffiniacais.

Personalities
 Bernard Hinault, cyclist, was born in Yffiniac in 1954.
 Roger Flouriot is a writer and was born in Yffiniac.
 The cyclist Zéphirin Jégard lived in Yffiniac.

See also
Communes of the Côtes-d'Armor department

References

External links

Official website 

Communes of Côtes-d'Armor